Mompha raschkiella is a species of micromoth in the family Momphidae. The moth was first described by German entomologist Philipp Christoph Zeller in 1838.

Description
Adults are on wing in May and again in August. There are two generations per year. The moth is small and distinctively marked. The species could be confused with Mompha locupletella, but it lacks that species contrasting dark and light patches at the base of the forewing.

Larvae
The oval eggs are laid on the surface of leaves, usually near the midrib. Larvae are yellow with a brown head and have a thoracic plate and an anal plate. They mine the leaves of rosebay willowherb (Epilobium angustifolium)  causing a yellowish blotch on the leaves that bleach rapidly after the larvae leave them. The caterpillars occur in May to late July and late August to September  They overwinter as a pupa and pupation occurs among detritus on the ground.

Habitat
The species is endemic to Europe. They can be found in waste ground, woodland clearings, heathland, and roadside verges. The moth is rare in Belgium. The moth is common and widely distributed on the Isle of Wight and in southern Hampshire. They can be found in the woods of Northwich. The moth is common in Suffolk, especially in coastal areas and Brecks. The species has been recorded by the St. Helens Wilflife Recording Group as scarce in St. Helens, Merseyside. As of October 2009, the moth has been recorded in 9.6% of Huntingdonshire.

References

Momphidae
Leaf miners
Moths described in 1838
Moths of Europe
Taxa named by Philipp Christoph Zeller